Verticordia etheliana is a flowering plant in the myrtle family, Myrtaceae and is endemic to the south-west of Western Australia. It is a shrub with one highly branched main stem, egg-shaped to almost round leaves and spike-like groups of bright red flowers with greenish-cream centres.

Description

Flowering time is from July to November or December.

Taxonomy and naming
Verticordia etheliana was first formally described by Charles Gardner in 1942 and the description was published in the Journal of the Royal Society of Western Australia from specimens collected between "Yaringa" station and Northampton by William Blackall. The specific epithet (etheliana) honours Ethel Gray Blackall, the wife of the collector of the type specimens.

When Alex George reviewed the genus Verticordia in 1991, he described two varieties of this species:
 Verticordia etheliana var. formosa  A.S.George  which shorter leaves, flower stalks, sepals, petals and styles than var. etheliana;.

George placed this species in subgenus Eperephes, section Pennuligera along with V. comosa, V. lepidophylla, V. chrysostachys, V. dichroma, V. x eurardyensis, V. muelleriana, V. argentea, V. aereiflora, V. fragrans, V. venusta, V. forrestii, V. serotina, V. oculata, V. albida and V. grandis.

Distribution and habitat
This verticordia grows in sandy, gravelly or loamy soil, in heath or shrubland between the Billabong Roadhouse and the Kalbarri National Park and as far east as near Mullewa in the Avon Wheatbelt, Geraldton Sandplains and Yalgoo biogeographic regions.

Conservation
Both varieties of Verticordia etheliana are classified as "not threatened" by the Western Australian Government Department of Parks and Wildlife.

Use in horticulture
Both varieties of V. etheliana  are strikingly attractive and have been grown in gardens, although propagation and cultivation are difficult.

References

etheliana
Rosids of Western Australia
Eudicots of Western Australia
Plants described in 1942